Brett Grogan (born 30 August 1973) is an Australian former rugby league footballer who played in the 1990s and 2000s. He played for the Newcastle Knights from 1994 to 1998, the Gateshead Thunder in 1999 and finally the Northern Eagles in 2000.

References

External links
http://www.rugbyleagueproject.org/players/Brett_Grogan/summary.html

1973 births
Living people
Australian rugby league players
Australian expatriate sportspeople in England
Gateshead Thunder (1999) players
Indigenous Australian rugby league players
Newcastle Knights players
Newcastle Yowies players
Northern Eagles players
Rugby league centres
Rugby league players from Newcastle, New South Wales
Rugby league wingers